Game Shakers is an American comedy television series created by Dan Schneider that premiered on Nickelodeon on September 12, 2015. The series ran for three seasons, with its final episode airing on June 8, 2019. It stars Cree Cicchino, Madisyn Shipman, Benjamin "Lil' P-Nut" Flores, Jr., Thomas Kuc, and Kel Mitchell.

Premise 
The series revolves around two seventh graders, Babe and Kenzie, living in Brooklyn, New York, who create a video game app called "Sky Whale" for their school science project. When the game proves to be wildly successful, they form a gaming company called Game Shakers, and hire their friend, Hudson. They later partner with rapper Double G, who becomes their investor as part of a compromise for their illegal use of his song, "Drop Dat What", in their game. Double G's son, Triple G, then becomes a video game consultant for the company, making him the fourth Game Shaker.

Episodes

Cast and characters

Main 
 Cree Cicchino as Babe Carano, creator of Game Shakers at 12-years-old. She always does her own thing and doesn't mind stepping on someone's toes to do so. She is confident, quick-witted, and fearless when it comes to making tough decisions. In "MeGo the Freakish Robot", it is revealed that Babe is allergic to peanuts.
 Madisyn Shipman as Kenzie Bell, creator of Game Shakers at 12-years-old. She lacks a social filter and tends to be extremely blunt, but makes up for her lackluster social skills with incredible tech knowledge. 
 Benjamin "Lil' P-Nut" Flores, Jr. as Triple G, the son of Double G who had a lavish childhood, but all that he really wants is to be with children his own age. He's eventually hired by Babe and Kenzie as the video game consultant. In "Shark Explosion", it is revealed that his first name is Grover.
 Thomas Kuc as Hudson, a friend of Babe and Kenzie as well as a member of Game Shakers. Despite knowing that Hudson isn't necessarily intelligent, Babe states in "Sky Whale" that he's cute and will do whatever she and Kenzie say.
 Kel Mitchell as Double G, a successful rapper and billionaire whose real name is Gale J. Griffin. He is impulsive, unpredictable, and determined to have as much fun and money as possible. With the help of Babe and Kenzie, he rediscovers his love for gaming, and becomes the main investor of Game Shakers. In "Revenge at Tech Fest", Double G gets a temporary trionic right arm after his right arm is badly broken following a slingshot incident caused by MeGo. In "The Switch", it is revealed that Double G is allergic to shrimp.

Recurring 
 Shel Bailey as Ruthless, Double G's tall assistant who speaks extremely loudly.
 Bubba Ganter as Bunny, Double G's childish assistant.
 Regi Davis as Mr. Sammich, Babe, Kenzie, and Hudson's science teacher at Sugar Hill Junior High School. While he is often annoyed when Double G crashes his classes to scold Babe and Kenzie on something they did wrong, Mr. Sammich tends to cower when Ruthless and Bunny are with him.
 Tanner Buchanan as Mason Kendall, an older boy whom Babe has a crush on. In "The Mason Experience", Mason moves away to Florida.
 Todd Bosley as Teague, a waiter at Fooders.

Production 
When ordered to series in early 2015, it was planned that the first season would consist of 26 episodes. The cast of the series was announced on July 7, 2015. On July 25, 2015, the network announced some special guest stars, including Matt Bennett, Yvette Nicole Brown, GloZell, Jared "ProJared" Knabenbauer, and Smosh Games host David "Lasercorn" Moss. On March 2, 2016, Nickelodeon announced that the series had been renewed for a second season. The second season premiered on Nickelodeon on September 17, 2016. Nickelodeon renewed Game Shakers for a third season on November 16, 2016. The third season premiered on Nickelodeon on February 10, 2018. On March 26, 2018, Nickelodeon announced that Game Shakers had been canceled and would end after its third season.

Broadcast 
The series premiered on YTV in Canada on October 6, 2015, and debuted on Nickelodeon channels in the United Kingdom and Ireland on November 2, 2015, and in Australia and New Zealand on February 8, 2016.

Reception

Ratings 
 

| link2             = List of Game Shakers episodes#Season 2 (2016–17)
| episodes2         = 24
| start2            = 
| end2              = 
| startrating2      = 1.56
| endrating2        = 1.38
| viewers2          = |2}} 

| link3             = List of Game Shakers episodes#Season 3 (2018–19)
| episodes3         = 18
| start3            = 
| end3              = 
| startrating3      = 1.47
| endrating3        = 0.56
| viewers3          = |2}} 
}}

Nominations

Video games 
Over the course of the series, a number of games designed by the characters have been shown on Game Shakers. These games have been released online and through the Nick app. Several of the games share titles with episodes of the series (e.g. "Sky Whale", "Dirty Blob", "Tiny Pickles", "Nasty Goats", and "Llama Llama Spit Spit"). The following is the list of games that have been released:

 Sky Whale
 Dirty Blob
 Tiny Pickles
 Punchy Face
 Pop Star Surgeon
 Scubaroo
 Nasty Goats
 Pick It, Scratch It, Pop It
 Octopie
 Psycho Beach Mummies
 Ballarina
 Llama Llama Spit Spit
 Crime Warp

References

External links 
  (archived)
 
 

2010s American children's comedy television series
2010s Nickelodeon original programming
2015 American television series debuts
2019 American television series endings
English-language television shows
Television series by Schneider's Bakery
Television series created by Dan Schneider